Jacques Du Toit (born 2 January 1980) is a cricketer who played for Leicestershire. He is a middle order right handed batsman who can also bowl medium fast.

Originally from South Africa, English qualified Du Toit played for Leicestershire between 2008 and 2012. In 2008 he made his maiden first class century against Northamptonshire and his highest one day score came when he scored 144 from 119 balls in the Pro40 game with Glamorgan, although it was not enough to prevent a four-wicket defeat.

The 2010 was successful, with Du Toit scoring 899 County Championship runs, culminating im him signing a new two-year contract. His performances in all forms of the county game earned him the honour of winning Leicestershire's Supporter's Player of the Year.

Career best performances

References

External links

Leicestershire Profile

1980 births
Cricketers from Port Elizabeth
Living people
South African cricketers
Leicestershire cricketers
Colombo Cricket Club cricketers
Northumberland cricketers
Cumberland cricketers